Aerovias S/A Minas Gerais was a Brazilian airline founded in 1944. It went bankrupt in 1949.

History 
Aerovias Minas Gerais was founded on February 7, 1944, and flights started in 1945. The airline was grounded on November 23, 1949, and went bankrupt.

Destinations 
Aerovias Minas Gerais served cities in Minas Gerais.

Fleet

See also

List of defunct airlines of Brazil

References

External links 

Defunct airlines of Brazil
Airlines established in 1944
Airlines disestablished in 1949
1944 establishments in Brazil
1949 disestablishments in Brazil